Gundawan is a village in the southern state of Karnataka, India. It is located in the Indi taluk of Bijapur district.

References

Villages in Bijapur district, Karnataka